The Mornoi River is a tributary of the Brahmaputra River in the Indian state of Assam. The Mornoi river originates at Matia village of Goalpara district. The Krishnai River meets Dudhnoi River at Matia village and then flows as Mornoi river before its confluence with the Brahmaputra river.

References 

Rivers of Assam
Rivers of India